Zip Zip is a French animated television series created by Aurore Damant, based on an original idea by Anne Ozannat. The series is produced by GO-N Productions with the participation of France Télévisions, Super RTL and The Walt Disney Company France in association with A Plus Image 3. The series premiered on Super RTL in Germany on March 23, 2015 and on France 3 in France on April 4. It was renewed for a second series which premiered on July 8, 2019, with the English dub premiering on YouTube on August 6, 2021.

Premise 
Tired of living in the forest, Washington the fox, Sam the boar, his sister Eugenie, and Suzie the blackbird decide to leave the wilderness and go to the city. To avoid being seen by people as wild animals and getting caught by animal control, the four take animal costumes to disguise themselves as a dog (Washington), a cat (Sam), a rabbit (Eugenie) and a canary (Suzie) and pose as common house pets. They are soon adopted by the Livingstones, and now live in their house with their cat, Victoria.

Voice cast

Episodes

Season 1

Season 2

Crew 
 Directed by: Lionel Allaix
 Produced by: Eric Garnet and Anne de Galard 
 Series created by: Aurore Damant 
 Based on an original idea by: Anne Ozannat 
 Script editors: Cynthia True, Matthieu Chevallier (season 2), Johanna Goldschmidt (season 2)
 Music composed by: Séverin
 Executive Producer: Eric Garnet
 Associate Producer: Anne de Galard
 Line Producer: Emmanuel de Franceschi
 Production manager: Séverine Modzelewski (season 2)
 Production coordinators: Séverine Modzelewski, Amélie Oliveau, Lysa Jumelle (season 2)
 Production assistant: Zuka Lelashvili (season 2)
 1st assistant directors: Stéphane Bevilacqua, Margaux Ollier (season 2)
 2nd assistant directors: Mathias Cottreau, Matthias Pialoux (season 2)
 Script coordinator: Amélie Oliveau
 Digital content production (season 2): Amélie Oliveau, Agathe Fradet 
 Translators: Leslie Damant-Jeandel, Manon Cranney, Rob Conrath, Justine Bannister, Patty Hannock (season 2), Jonathan Sly (season 2)
 Story boarders: Lionel Allaix, Anthony Pascal, Christophe Pittet, Gark, Philippe Leconte, Thierry Sapyn, Baptiste Lucas, Nicolas Moschini, Nima Azarba, Fred Mintoff, Brice Magnier, Julien Thompson, Dominique Etchecopar, Olivier Derynck, and Ronan Le Brun
 Chief character designer: Marc Bascougnano
 Characters design (season 2): Érika Brémon, Mansoureh Kamaribidkorpeh, Hadrien Bonnet, Sylvain Bonnet, Éric Gosselet 
 Background design team: Baptiste Lucas, Bertrand Piocelle, Tiphaine Schroeder, Thomas Greffard, Manuel Tanon-Tchi, Roland Di Constanzo (season 2), Sophie Castaignede (season 2)
 Props and FX designers: Louis-Gaël "Elger" Le Breton, Ahmed Guerrouache, François Maumont, José Lemaire (season 2)
 Colour Styling team: Caroline Vanden Abeele, Christine Lips, Sylvia Lorrain, Manuel Tanon-Tchi
 Storyboard Assistants: Johann Cheneval, Cédric Frémeaux, Colin Albert (season 2)
 Animation Director: Julien Cayot
 Characters Builds: Mathieu Chaptel, Adeline Monin, Thomas Greffard
 Animation References: Mathieu Chaptel, Caroline Piochon, Mourad Seddiki
 Layout Team: Franck Bonay, Miguel Larzillière, Brendan Merien
 Chief Animators: Christophe N'Guyen, Gary Dominguez, Juliette Laurent
 Animatics Editing: Fiona Couturier, Antoine Delaporte
 Final Editing: Fiona Couturier, Antoine Delaporte
 Dialogues adapted by: Elise An, Antoine Ledoux, Clémentine Blayo-Nogret (season 2), Justine Dupont-Breitburd (season 2)
 Literary Bible: Aurore Damant, Anne Ozannat
 Graphic Bible: Aurore Damant, Manuel Tanon-Tchi 
 Trainee: Juliette Cuisinier

References

External links
 Official website at France 3
 Official website at Go-N Productions

2010s French animated television series
2015 French television series debuts
French children's animated adventure television series
French children's animated comedy television series
French-language television shows
French flash animated television series
Disney animated television series